Pija Kola (also Romanized as Pījā Kolā; also known as Pīchā Kolā) is a village in Karipey Rural District, Lalehabad District, Babol County, Mazandaran Province, Iran. At the 2006 census, its population was 1,318, in 322 families.

References 

Populated places in Babol County